The Women competition at the 2018 World Sprint Speed Skating Championships was held on 3 and 4 March 2018.

Results

500 m
The race was started on 3 March at 17:00.

1000 m
The race was started on 3 March at 18:42.

500 m
The race was started on 4 March at 16:00.

1000 m
The race was started on 4 March at 17:41.

Overall standings
After all events.

References

Women
World